Thurupulanka is a village in Allavaram Mandal, Dr. B.R. Ambedkar Konaseema district in the state of Andhra Pradesh in India.

Geography 

Demographics 
 India census, Thurupulanka had a population of 1707, out of which 862 were male and 845 were female. The population of children below 6 years of age was 8%. The literacy rate of the village was 82%.

References 

Villages in Allavaram mandal